The Connecticut Republican Party is the Connecticut affiliate of the national Republican Party.

Republicans control neither chamber of the state legislature, no constitutional state offices, none of the state's five seats in the U.S. House, and neither of its two U.S. Senate seats. The last Republican to represent the state in the U.S. House was Chris Shays, who lost his seat in 2008. The last Republican to represent the state in the U.S. Senate was Lowell Weicker, who lost his seat in 1988 to Joe Lieberman.

Town Committees
In Connecticut, there are Republican Town Committees in many of the towns and cities. The committees have the ability to endorse candidates in primary elections.

Elected officials

Members of Congress

U.S. Senate
 None

Both of Connecticut's U.S. Senate seats have been held by Democrats since 1988. Lowell Weicker was the last Republican to represent Connecticut in the U.S. Senate. First elected in 1970, Weicker lost his bid for a fourth term in 1988 to Joe Lieberman.

U.S. House of Representatives
None

All 5 of Connecticut's congressional districts have been held by Democrats since 2008. The last Republican to represent Connecticut in the House of Representatives was Chris Shays. First elected in a 1987 special election, Shays was subsequently defeated by Democratic challenger Jim Himes in 2008.

Statewide offices
 None

Connecticut has not elected any GOP candidates to statewide office since 2006, when Jodi Rell was elected to a full term as governor. First elected as lieutenant governor in 1994, Rell assumed the position of governor in 2004 following the resignation of John G. Rowland. In 2010, Rell opted not to seek re-election to a second term. Former U.S. Ambassador Thomas C. Foley ran as the Republican nominee in the 2010 election and was subsequently defeated by Democratic challenger Dannel Malloy.

State legislative leaders
Senate Minority Leader: Kevin C. Kelly
House Minority Leader: Vincent Candelora

Republican National Committee members
Committeeman: John H. Frey
Committeewoman: Leora Levy

References

External links
Connecticut Republican Party
Connecticut Republican State Central Committee Rules and Bylaws

Republican
Connecticut